Lucien Schmikale is a German professional basketball player.

Club career
In July 2022, he joined Dresden Titans.

National team
He represented Germany at the 2017 FIBA U20 European Championship in Greece.

Player profile
Schmikale is known for his scoring and outside shooting abilities.

References

External links
Eurobasket.com Profile
FIBA.com profile
German league profile

1997 births
Living people
Forwards (basketball)
Guards (basketball)
German men's basketball players
Sportspeople from Oldenburg